Matt Peacock is an Australian journalist, writer of Killer Company.

Matt(hew) Peacock is the name of:

Matthew Peacock (racehorse trainer) for Dante
Matt Peacock, married Jodie Marsh as culmination of TV series Totally Jodie Marsh: Who'll Take Her Up the Aisle?
Matt Peacock (baseball), American professional baseball  pitcher